Kennet was a non-metropolitan local government district in Wiltshire, England, abolished as part of the 2009 structural changes to local government in England.  It was named after the River Kennet.

The district was formed on 1 April 1974, under the Local Government Act 1972, by a merger of the municipal boroughs of Devizes, Marlborough, and Devizes Rural District, Marlborough and Ramsbury Rural District and Pewsey Rural District.

The district council was based at offices in Devizes. It was abolished on 1 April 2009 as part of the 2009 structural changes to local government in England, when its functions were taken over by the new Wiltshire Council unitary authority.

See also
Kennet local elections
2007 Kennet District Council election

English districts abolished in 2009
Former non-metropolitan districts of Wiltshire